Frederick Henry, Electoral Prince of the Palatinate, (1 January 1614 – 7 January 1629 in the Netherlands) was the eldest son of Frederick V, Elector Palatine and so-called "Winter King" of Bohemia, and his wife, Elizabeth Stuart, daughter of King James VI of Scotland and I of England.

As soon as the prince was born, Elizabeth ordered "pieces" using the English word, meaning the firing of cannon to celebrate the birth. 
He was named after his father and his late uncle Henry, Prince of Wales, who had died less than two years earlier during the celebrations leading up to his parents' wedding. As a gift to celebrate Frederick Henry's birth, King James rewarded Elizabeth with a pension of 12,000 crowns a year for life and money and gold worth an additional 25,000 crowns.

In 1618, Frederick was elected King of Bohemia. Frederick Henry was the only one of his siblings to accompany his parents to Prague for the coronation and was elected successor to the Crown a few days before the birth of his brother Rupert. In September 1620,  he was sent on a royal progress through Bohemia and the Upper Palatinate with a guard of 4,000 men, which ended in Leeuwarden where his kinsman Ernst Casimir, Stadtholder of Friesland, Groningen and Drenthe, took custody of him.

After his parents lost control of Bohemia and the Palatinate, they fled to exile in the Hague. Frederick Henry joined them by May 1621, when he wrote a letter from the Hague to King James. In June 1623, his parents set up a separate royal court for their children at a building three hours away in Leiden, known as the Prinsenhof or the Princes' court. Frederick Henry also formally enrolled as a student at Leiden University.

As part of various efforts to fight or negotiate an end to the Thirty Years War, several potential marriages were considered for Frederick Henry. These include marriages to a daughter of Holy Roman Emperor Ferdinand II and a niece of Maximilian I, Duke of Bavaria.

In 1629, Frederick Henry went with his father to Amsterdam to see the captured Spanish treasure fleet. While crossing Haarlemmermeer, their  boat was struck by a barge and capsized. Frederick was rescued but Frederick Henry drowned and his body was not found until the next day. He was buried in the Kloosterkerk, in the Hague.

Ancestry

References

External links
 Frederick Henry von der Pfalz at www.thepeerage.com

House of Palatinate-Simmern
Deaths by drowning
1614 births
1629 deaths
Princes of the Palatinate
Accidental deaths in the Netherlands
Heirs apparent who never acceded
17th-century German people
Bohemian princes
Royalty and nobility who died as children
Sons of kings